Ondřej Kušnír (born 5 April 1984) is a Czech former professional footballer who played for various clubs in the Czech Republic, Kazakhstan and Romania. He won the Czech title with Sparta Prague in 2009–10. Kušnír also played internationally, representing the Czech Republic four times.

Club career
He won the Czech title with Sparta Prague in 2009–10.

In February 2014, Kušnír signed a one-year contract with FC Tobol of the Kazakhstan Premier League. He returned to the Czech Republic, joining Sigma Olomouc in February 2015 on a contract until the end of the 2015–16 season. Kušnír was one of three Czechs, together with Jiří Jeslínek and Tomáš Josl, who joined Romanian Liga II side Rapid Bucharest in the summer of 2015.

Kušnír joined Dukla Prague on a free transfer shortly before the beginning of the 2016–17 season. After scoring 5 goals in 49 matches, he left Dukla at the end of the 2017–18 season. Having spent his last two seasons at Fotbal Třinec, Kušnír retired from his playing career at the end of the 2019–20 season.

International career
Kušnír played for the Czech Republic at youth level, playing for both the under-19 and under-21 national teams. After being called up to the national team at the end of 2009, but remaining an unused substitute, on 3 March 2010, Kušnír made his debut for the senior side of his country in the 0–1 loss against Scotland in a friendly match. He played in the 2011 Kirin Cup Soccer tournament, making the last of his four appearances for the Czech Republic in a 0–0 draw against Peru.

Personal life
His father was also a professional footballer playing for TJ Vítkovice. In the 1985–86 season he won the Czechoslovak First League with them.

Honours
Viktoria Žižkov
Czech National Football League: 2006–07

Sparta Prague
Czech First League: 2009–10

Sigma Olomouc
Czech National Football League: 2014–15

Rapid București
Liga II: 2015–16

References

External links
 
 
 
 
 
 
 

1984 births
Living people
Sportspeople from Ostrava
Association football fullbacks
Czech footballers
Czech Republic youth international footballers
Czech Republic under-21 international footballers
Czech Republic international footballers
Czech expatriate footballers
Czech First League players
Liga II players
Kazakhstan Premier League players
MFK Vítkovice players
FC Slovan Liberec players
AC Sparta Prague players
FK Viktoria Žižkov players
FC Rapid București players
FC Tobol players
FK Dukla Prague players
Expatriate footballers in Romania
Expatriate footballers in Kazakhstan
FK Fotbal Třinec players
Czech National Football League players